Events from the year 1914 in Sweden

Incumbents
 Monarch – Gustaf V
 Prime Minister - Karl Staaff, Hjalmar Hammarskjöld

Events

 6 February - Peasant armament support march
 Courtyard Speech
 March 1914 Swedish general election
 28 May – Selma Lagerlöf inducted to the Swedish Academy. 
 September 1914 Swedish general election

Births

 14 February - Britt G. Hallqvist
 11 July - Sven Fahlman, fencer (died 2003)

Deaths

 20 April – Ivar Wickman, physician, who discovered in 1907 the epidemic and contagious character of poliomyelitis  (born 1872)
 10 November - Nils Christoffer Dunér, astronomer (born 1839)

References

 
Years of the 20th century in Sweden
Sweden